The following elections occurred in the year 1827.

 1827 Chilean presidential election
 1827 French legislative election

North America

United States
 United States Senate election in New York, 1827

See also
 :Category:1827 elections

1827
Elections